Part Nine (Part IX) of the Constitution of Albania is the ninth of eighteen parts. Titled The Courts, it consists of 22 articles including the Article 144 which was repealed in 2016. Together with Part Eight (Constitutional Court), and Part Ten (The Office of the Prosecutor) underwent radical changes in 2016 during the so-called Justice Reform, which were the efforts of lawmakers to fight corruption, organized crime, nepotism in the justice system.

The Courts

References

9